The Pine Lake tornado was a deadly tornado in central Alberta which occurred on Friday, July 14, 2000, and struck a campground and a trailer park. Twelve people were killed, making it the first deadly tornado in Canada since 1987, when an F4 tornado killed 27 people in Edmonton, Alberta and injured 300+.

Summary

On July 14, 2000, at approximately 7 PM, an F3 tornado tore through the Green Acres Campground at Pine Lake in central Alberta, killing 12 people and critically injuring more than 100 others. The tornado formed out of a severe thunderstorm which formed on the eastern slopes of the Canadian Rockies and moved rapidly eastward, encountering a narrow band of low-level moisture that caused it to develop into a supercell thunderstorm.

The heaviest damage occurred in a   central corridor. Damage assessment suggests that winds within the central corridor reached . In addition, Weather Watchers reported hail as large as baseballs.

An average of 16 tornadoes occur in Alberta every year, and an average of 41 tornadoes occur each year in the Prairie Provinces. The highest death toll due to a single tornado in Alberta occurred on July 31, 1987, colloquially referred to as Black Friday. Canada ranks second in the world for tornado occurrences after the United States.

Chronology 
 5:37 PM Mountain Daylight Time (MDT) – Environment Canada issues a severe thunderstorm watch for the Red Deer area, including Pine Lake.
 6:18 PM MDT – watch upgraded to a severe thunderstorm warning, indicating that a thunderstorm with potentially large hail, very heavy rain, intense lightning and dangerous winds had developed.
 7:00 PM MDT – the tornado destroys a number of recreational vehicles in the Green Acres Campground on the western shore of Pine Lake. 12 people are killed and more than 100 critically injured.
 7:05 PM MDT – RCMP notify Environment Canada that a tornado had just been reported at Pine Lake. The severe thunderstorm warning was immediately upgraded to a tornado warning.
 After 7:05 PM MDT – Warnings and watches were continued through the evening hours. In all, more than 40 watches and warnings were issued for Alberta and Saskatchewan as the storm crossed the provincial boundary.

See also 
 List of tornadoes and tornado outbreaks
 List of North American tornadoes and tornado outbreaks
 List of Canadian tornadoes

References

External links 
 GOES Imagery of the Tornado
 GOES Animation

Tornadoes in Alberta
Red Deer County
Tornadoes of 2000
F3 tornadoes
2000 in Canada
July 2000 events in Canada
2000-07-14
2000 disasters in Canada